Pinkney City (also called Pinkneyville) was a small community outside of Fort Colville (US Army) in what is now Stevens County (Washington).  Originally named for Brevet Major Pinkney Lugenbeel, first commander and builder of the fort in 1859.  The town grew up around the fort shortly after.

The civilian town just north of the U.S. Army post soon became an important trading center and, in 1860, the county seat for the original Spokane County. In 1863, original Spokane County Board of County Commissioners petitioned the legislature to make Stevens County, which had not yet organized, part of Spokane County.  Instead in 1864, the Washington Territorial Legislature dissolved Spokane County and made it part of Stevens County with the original Spokane County Commissioners and the county seat at Pinkney City retained. The first post office for the town was established 17 December 1859 and discontinued April 17, 1860. The next post office was established November 25, 1862 and called Fort Colville. Its name was changed to Colville on April 13, 1883. After the fort was abandoned in 1882, Pinkney City began to disappear with most businesses moving three miles to the current town of Colville, Washington.

Pinkney City is located on Aladdin Rd at Douglas Falls Rd. The speed limit through here is 35 MPH.

See also
Colville, Washington

External links
Harrigan papers: Map showing the location of the post office at Fort Colville and Pinkney City
US Fort Colville Accounts Ledger

References

Ghost towns in Stevens County, Washington
Ghost towns in Washington (state)
Populated places established in 1861
1861 establishments in Washington Territory